Orin Ercel "Babe" Hollingbery (July 15, 1893 – January 12, 1974) was an American football coach.  He served as the head football coach at the State College of Washington—now known as Washington State University—for 17 seasons, from 1926 to 1942, and compiled a record of 93–53–14. Hollingbery's 93 wins are the most by any head coach in the history of the Washington State Cougars football program. He was inducted into the College Football Hall of Fame in 1979.

Early years
Born in Hollister, California, Hollingbery was raised in San Francisco and never attended college. He coached local high school football, even leading three teams one fall, and later coached at the Olympic Club. One of his players at Olympic was Buck Bailey, who became his line coach at Washington State in 1926 and headed the Cougar baseball program until 1961.

Washington State
Hollingbery coached at Washington State during what is generally agreed as its greatest football era.  The Cougars did not lose a home game from 1926 to 1935, and the 1930 team advanced to the Rose Bowl against Alabama. He coached some of the greatest names in Washington State history, including Turk Edwards, Mel Hein, Mel Dressel, Dale Gentry, Ed Goddard, Harold Ahlskog, Elmer Schwartz, Bob Kennedy, Nick Suseoff, Bill Sewell, John Bley, and Herbert "Butch" Meeker.

Before the 1943 season, the football program went on hiatus due to World War II; Hollingbery trained U.S. Army troops on campus and coached eighth-grade football. He took a one-year leave of absence, beginning in mid-1944, moved to Yakima, and started a lucrative hop-growing business. When the Cougar football program was restarted, Hollingberry was asked to take a pay cut and did not return to Pullman.

Hollingbery Fieldhouse at Washington State University, a facility serving many different sports, was built in 1929 and renamed for the coach in 1963; the dedication ceremony was at halftime of the Battle of the Palouse football game with Idaho on November 2. Hired after three consecutive Cougar losses to Idaho, Hollingberry never lost to the Vandals, with 16 wins and a tie.

East-West Shrine Game
Hollingbery also was the creator of the East–West Shrine Game and the head coach of the West team in the first Shrine Game in 1925. He coached in a total of 18 Shrine Games, leading players such as Harold Muller, Rags Matthews, and George Sauer.

Northwest League
Involved in minor league baseball in Yakima, Hollingbery was the president of the new Northwest League for the 1955 season. Hired in June after the resignation of Arthur Pohlman, Hollingbery stepped down that November.

Death
In late December 1973, Hollingbery suffered a stroke, fell into a coma, and died several weeks later at age 80. His wife, Hazel, died eleven years later, days before her 91st birthday; they are buried at Terrace Heights Memorial Park in Yakima.

Head coaching record

References

External links
 
 

1893 births
1974 deaths
Washington State Cougars football coaches
High school football coaches in California
College Football Hall of Fame inductees
People from Hollister, California
Sportspeople from San Francisco